Amayé may refer to the following places in Calvados, France:

Amayé-sur-Orne
Amayé-sur-Seulles